Mick O'Brien (born March 26, 1961) is an Irish musician.

Life
Born in Dublin, Ireland, Mick began his musical education on the uilleann pipes in the renowned Thomas Street Pipers Club in Dublin. His father Dinny O'Brien, a traditional "box" player, was also a constant source of tunes and inspiration.

Mick recorded his first LP with his family when he was 13 years old. He later joined Na Píobairí Uilleann, an organisation founded to promote piping, where he absorbed hundreds of tunes and refined his technique. His playing can be heard on numerous recordings with artists such as The Dubliners, Frankie Gavin and the RTÉ Concert Orchestra.

Mick has toured extensively and given master classes throughout Europe and North America. His highly acclaimed solo CD of traditional Irish music; "May Morning Dew" was released in 1996.

In 2003, Mick released Kitty Lie Over along with fiddler Caoimhín Ó Raghallaigh.  It was named No.1 Traditional Album of 2003 by Earle Hitchner in the Irish Echo.

2011 saw the release of Mick's second album with Caoimhín Ó Raghallaigh. The new album is named Deadly Buzz  Aoibhinn Crónán.

Mick is former a teacher in St Davids C.B.S in Artane Dublin, where he taught Geography and Irish, among other subjects. Mick also looked after the hurlers of the school.

Mick has worked with several Irish composers including Michael Holohan, Linda Buckley and Dave Flynn.

He premiered the first ever set of Études for Uilleann Pipes in 2011 at the Masters of Tradition Festival in Bantry. They were composed for him by Dave Flynn.

Pipes and whistles
Mick's concert pitch uilleann pipes were built by William Rowsome in 1921, with a new chanter and extra A/G drone made by Alain Froment, who also made Mick's Bb, B, and C sets.  His whistles were made by Mike Burke in the USA.

References

Irish uilleann pipers
1961 births
Living people